WBNC (1340 AM; "Easy 95.3") is a radio station licensed to serve Conway, New Hampshire, United States. It is owned by Mt. Washington Radio & Gramophone, L.L.C. which also owns WMWV and WVMJ. WBNC is a class C (local) station. It was granted a license to cover on December 7, 2012. When it came on the air, it inherited the WBNC calls, tourist information format and FM rebroadcaster from sister station WPQR, which was taken silent.

On March 17, 2017, WBNC changed their format from travelers information to soft adult contemporary, branded as "Easy 95.3".

Previous logo

References

External links

BNC
Carroll County, New Hampshire
Radio stations established in 2012
2012 establishments in New Hampshire
Soft adult contemporary radio stations in the United States